Paulette Gebara Farah was a four year old disabled Mexican girl who disappeared, and was subsequently found dead under suspicious circumstances. She went missing from her bedroom on March 22, 2010, in the municipality of Huixquilucan de Degollado, Mexico. Upon her disappearance, her family began a search campaign utilizing television, advertisements, and social media. 

Paulette's body was found in her own room wrapped in sheets between the mattress and the foot of the bed, the same room where her mother had given interviews. The room had already been searched by experts from various agencies, including search and rescue dogs. Her body was discovered on March 31st due to the smell of putrefaction.  

Her death was ruled accidental by Attorney General of the State of Mexico Alberto Bazbaz whose investigation concluded that Paulette died during the night after she turned herself around in bed and ended up at the foot, dying of asphyxia, “by obstruction of the nasal cavities and thorax-abdominal compression". She was buried at the Panteón Francés de San Joaquín (French Saint Joaquín Cemetery) located in Mexico City in 2010, before her remains were exhumed and cremated on 3 May 2017.

Chronology

Paulette's disappearance 
On the night of March 21, 2010, Paulette Gebara, her sister, and her father, Mauricio Gebara, returned from a Valle de Bravo trip to their Huixquilucan apartment. The mother of the girls, Lizette Farah, stayed up late to put them to bed. On the morning of March 22, one of Gebara's nannies, Erika, entered the room to wake Gebara, but could not find her. She notified Farah and they both began searching the building. Mauricio Gebara informed his sister of the disappearance of his daughter, who informed Huixquilucan authorities. Later, the mayor, Alfredo del Mazo Maza, notified the Attorney General of the State of Mexico, Alberto Bazbaz.

After the initial search of the apartment building, Paulette's family claimed they could not find her. There were no signs of theft or kidnapping; the locks were intact, as well as the windows and doors. The housing complex had surveillance, but no evidence of Paulette leaving or being taken was found. Paulette could not go out alone, as she had a motor and language disability.

Search of her whereabouts and false statements 

That afternoon, the attorney general released a poster with a photo of Paulette and information about her age, appearance, and physical disabilities. Gebara's aunt, Arlette Farah, sent emails and uploaded a photo to social media, where the news quickly spread, prompting a large response. In the evening, Lizette Farah released a message on television to the alleged abductor asking that her daughter be returned to her, saying that she could be left in a shopping centre or a crowded place, and there would be no consequences. After the announcement, she distributed flyers with Paulette's face, put up billboards, and placed advertisements on television and public transport.

Mauricio also appeared in the media, asking that his daughter be returned to him. He recalled that he had gone out to work on the morning of March 22, when Paulette had apparently disappeared. On March 29, the attorney general announced that Paulette's parents, Erika and Martha Casimiro, Paulette's nannies, would be placed under a restriction order, due to falsehoods and inconsistencies in their statements.

On March 30, Paulette's parents spent several hours at the police station before being transferred to a hotel to comply with the restriction order. The same day, police experts placed blankets at the home for a reconstruction of events.

Discovery of her body and autopsy 
On March 31, at around 2:00 AM, Paulette's remains were found in her bedroom. In the leaked video of investigators, one voice is heard saying, "she was severely beaten" whilst examining the stained sheets. However, this statement was almost immediately refuted by General Attorney Bazbaz. Paulette had died accidentally due to "mechanical asphyxia due to obstruction of the nasal cavities and thorax-abdominal compression".

An autopsy revealed that Paulette slept with an "orthopaedic cloth" over her mouth, which was placed every night to prevent her from sleeping with her mouth open; that her body was not manipulated after her death; and that she had eaten at least five hours before her death. The body had two segments of rectangular adhesive cloth in vertical position on both cheeks, in addition to signs of a blow to the left elbow and knee. The official findings, however, indicated no signs of physical or sexual violence. The autopsy also established that her death occurred between five and nine days before the analysis was made, establishing that she could have died on the first day. This was reported on March 31st, although they did not reveal the exact date and hour of her death.

The official report also said that no traces of drugs or toxic substances in the body that could have affected the girl's consciousness. The conclusion was that Paulette "by her own means" moved on the bed and accidentally fell headlong into a space at the foot of her bed, where she died of asphyxiation, and subsequently remained unnoticed for nine days.

Aftermath 
On April 3, Farah initiated an amparo proceeding against the restriction order, claiming that she had not been involved in the events that caused her daughter's death. Specialists said that Farah suffered from personality disorders. During the procedure Farah became subject to indictment. On April 4th, a judge granted freedom to Paulette's parents and nannies. Mauricio Gebara left his hotel at 10:20; Farah left hers at 11:00; and the nannies, Erika and Martha Casimiro, at noon. None of them could leave the country due to the inquiries. On April 5th, in separate interviews, Gebara and Farah accused each other; Farah claimed that her husband blamed her for Paulette's death, whilst Gebara claimed that the death could not have been a simple accident, and that he could not completely trust his wife.

On April 6th, Paulette's body was buried at the Panteón Francés de San Joaquín in Mexico City. The funeral procession was headed by Farah without any member of the Gebara family in attendance due to an "agreement".

On April 7th, the Gebara family denied Farah's request to see her other daughter, Lizette, who had stayed with her father's family since April 4th. On May 10th, the Attorney General of the Federal District, who also collaborated in the case at the request of her counterpart in the State of Mexico, granted the custody of Paulette's sister to Farah, who brought a complaint against her husband demanding custody of the girl. On May 26, although Bazbaz defended the investigation and conclusions of the case, he resigned his position as Attorney General of the State of Mexico, saying that an attorney general needs confidence to act effectively, and that he had lost this confidence due to the questioning of his actions in the investigation of the death of Paulette Gebara Farah.

Seven years later on May 3, 2017, Paulette's body was exhumed and cremated, since authorities considered that her remains were no longer objects of evidence for the investigation of the case.

Controversies

Statements by Paulette's nannies 
Paulette's nannies, Ericka and Martha Casimiro, insisted that the girl's body was not under her mattress, with Martha stating:

and Erika stating:

Statements by Amanda de la Rosa 
A close friend of Farah, Amanda de la Rosa, was allowed to live in the Gebara's apartment for several days immediately following the girl's disappearance. Amanda slept in Paulette's room, which was not secured by the authorities. In the time she stayed in there, the bed was made on a daily basis, and nobody noticed the girl's body nor the bloody stains on the sheets as they appeared on the forensic video. As a result, Amanda was also investigated as a possible suspect, but no charges were filed. At the end of the investigation, she wrote Where's Paulette?, a book narrating the events from her personal perspective, questioning the discrepancies between the facts and the authorities' statements.

Forensics video 
Nine days after her disappearance, a team of three forensic experts entered Paulette's room at 2:00 AM. and walked to the bed and began taking measurements, loudly stating its characteristics and recording their activities on video. At one point, one of them declared twice that Paulette was "severely beaten" to death, and a few moments after, the forensic expert to his right removed the bed's blanket to reveal two large bloodstains, one of them the size of an adult's head. The same man walked to the front of the bed, with the help of another forensic expert, and removed all the sheets to reveal Paulette's corpse, partially hidden on one side of the mattress. 

Although the local authorities gave the video to the press as a document to prove how the body was found, there are several doubts about its authenticity. Most experts agree that it is a re-enactment, and not a real-time event, which may explain how one of the forensic experts could know that Paulette was beaten before any evidence was found. It would also explain the placement of the camera, and the position of the forensic experts in the exact place to be able to show all the elements to the public without any obstruction. It has also been noted that none of those present seems to show any surprise when discovering the body, and they even continue narrating the events with a mechanical voice, as if they were repeating a script. The time the video was recorded was very unusual as well. Such legal procedures are usually performed in the daytime.

The biggest controversy regarding the video was that as soon as it was released, Attorney General Bazbaz publicly stated that the images proved that Paulette had accidentally suffocated, avoiding any mention of violence. In later interviews and statements to the press, violence was not mentioned again, and the official cause of death was ruled as an accident.

Recording between Paulette's mother and older sister 
During the investigation of the case, a recording between Farah and Lizette, was released, in which Farah instructs her daughter to not say anything of Paulette's disappearance, so that they would not be blamed.

At first Farah denied this, saying that the recording was edited so it sounded like she was telling her daughter to hide any information. Later, however, she accepted that these were the words she said, stating, "I had the conversation with my daughter, but not in the context they showed it."

Paulette's pajamas 
In 2010 a YouTube video titled The Strange Case of Paulette's Pajamas became a point of interest and was spread via social media. The video compares photographs of Paulette's body dressed in blue and red reindeer pajamas with an interview with Farah recorded several days before the girl's body was found, in which the same pajamas appear in the girl's room. After this discovery was made public, the television network aired the footage without cuts, including all preparation prior to the interview. As Farah and the interviewing reporter examine various items owned by Paulette, the aforementioned pajamas appear. When asked about them, Farah stated that the pajamas belong to Paulette's sister. 

Despite this claim, these pajamas remained among Paulette's belongings, and as they could be seen in subsequent interviews in Paulette's closet. The authorities were never informed by the family that they had a second set of pajamas identical to the one the girl was wearing at the time of her disappearance. It is unknown what happened to these pajamas.

See also 

 Crime Diaries: The Search, a 2020 Netflix series

References 

2010 in Mexico
Child deaths
Deaths from asphyxiation
History of the State of Mexico
Mexican people with disabilities